Ait El Farsi is a commune in Tinghir Province of the Drâa-Tafilalet administrative region of Morocco. At the time of the 2014 census, the commune had a total population of 4754 people living in 751 households.

References

Populated places in Tinghir Province
Rural communes of Drâa-Tafilalet